The  was dispatched in 1860 by the Tokugawa shogunate (bakufu). Its objective was to ratify the new Treaty of Friendship, Commerce, and Navigation between the United States and Japan, in addition to being Japan's first diplomatic mission to the United States since the 1854 opening of Japan by Commodore Matthew Perry.

Another significant facet of the mission was the shogunate's dispatch of a Japanese warship, the Kanrin Maru, to accompany the delegation across the Pacific and thereby demonstrate the degree to which Japan had mastered Western navigation techniques and ship technologies barely six years after ending its isolation policy of nearly 250 years.

Background

On January 19, 1860, the Kanrin Maru set sail from Uraga for San Francisco under the leadership of Captain Katsu Kaishū, with Nakahama "John" Manjiro as the official translator, carrying 96 Japanese men and an American officer, John M. Brooke on board.  The overall head of the mission was Admiral  (木村喜毅), a high ranking Shogunate official. Fukuzawa Yukichi, the future educator and reformer, had volunteered his services as an assistant to Admiral Kimura.

The Japanese embassy itself traveled aboard a U.S. Navy ship, the USS Powhatan, which the Kanrin Maru escorted - albeit taking a different route across the Pacific and arriving before the Powhatan. The Japanese embassy was formally composed of three men: Ambassador Shinmi Masaoki (新見正興), Vice-Ambassador Muragaki Norimasa (村垣範正), and Observer Oguri Tadamasa (小栗忠順).

Destinations

San Francisco

The Kanrin Maru reached San Francisco directly, but the Powhatan (and the embassy) made a stopover in Hawaii first. When it arrived in San Francisco, the delegation stayed for a month, and Fukuzawa had himself photographed with an American girl, a photo that has since become one of the most famous in Japanese history. Fukuzawa also acquired an English–Chinese Webster's Dictionary, from which he began to study English seriously and prepare his own English–Japanese dictionary.

Washington, D.C., New York, and the return
 

When the Kanrin Maru returned to Japan, the Powhatan continued with the Embassy to Panama, where its members crossed the isthmus to the Atlantic via the recently opened Panama Railway. Changing ships for the USS Roanoke, the 72-man diplomatic mission then proceeded to Washington, D.C.  Numerous receptions were held in its honor, including one at the White House, where the diplomats met President James Buchanan. Buchanan presented them with a gold watch engraved with his likeness as a gift to the Shōgun.

The Japanese delegation traveled north to Philadelphia.  Their attention to activities planned by local officials was distracted by the news of what became known as the "Sakuradamon incident" in Tokyo. The Tairō Ii Naosuke had been assassinated on March 24; and accounts of the event were sped by pony express across the American continent. This murdered official had been the highest ranking signer of the Japanese-American 1858 "Harris Treaty", which was a follow-up to the 1854 Treaty of Kanagawa.

The delegation continued on to New York City, where their procession up Broadway from the Battery was a grand parade.

From New York, they crossed the Atlantic and Indian Oceans, all on board the USS Niagara, thus completing a circumnavigation. After leaving New York on June 30, the Niagara reached the harbor at Porto Grande, Cape Verde Islands, on July 16.  Other ports on the voyage back to Japan included São Paulo-de-Loande (now Luanda), Angola; Batavia (now Jakarta), Java; and Hong Kong. The frigate finally sailed into Tokyo Bay on November 8 to disembark her passengers.

Significance

The Kanrin Maru’s voyage from Uraga to San Francisco is often cited as the first crossing of the Pacific by an all-Japanese crew sailing on a Japanese ship, although the crew were advised by John M. Brooke. However, the Kanrin Maru’s was not the first Pacific crossing by a Japanese ship and crew: at least three such journeys had been made in the 17th century, before Japan's period of isolation: those by Tanaka Shōsuke in 1610, Hasekura Tsunenaga in 1614, and Yokozawa Shōgen in 1616.

See also

 Bernardo the Japanese, the first Japanese to visit Europe, in 1553
 Tenshō embassy, first Japanese embassy to visit Europe, in 1582
 Hasekura Tsunenaga, lead the Keichō Embassy, a diplomatic mission from 1613 through 1620,
 First Japanese Embassy to Europe (1862), in actuality the third embassy to Europe

Notes

See also
 First Japanese Embassy to Europe (1862)
 Second Japanese Embassy to Europe (1863)

References
 Shin Jinbutsu Ōrai-sha, eds.: Bakumatsu—Meiji Furushashin Chō Aizōhan (幕末・明治古写真帖 愛蔵版; Album of Bakumatsu- and Meiji-Period Photos, Enthusiasts’ Edition). Tokyo, 2003.  
 Shin Jinbutsu Ōrai-sha, eds.: Sekai wo Mita Bakumatsu-Ishin no Eiyūtachi (世界を見た幕末維新の英雄たち; Heros of Bakumatsu- and Meiji Restoration-Period who saw the world). Tokyo, 2007.

Further reading
The Tycoon's Ambassadors: Captain DuPont and the Japanese Embassy of 1860, Tom Marshall and Sidney Marshall. Green Forest Press, 2015.

External links
   JapanDayNYC 2010
 Arrival of First Japanese Embassy at the Navy Yard (1860) - story detailing the arrival of the Japanese Embassy
 Artifacts at Smithsonian from 1860 Japanese Embassy

Foreign relations of the Tokugawa shogunate
History of the foreign relations of the United States
1860 establishments in the United States
Japan–United States relations
1860 in Japan
Japanese embassies to the West